Allen Luther Sangree, also as Allan or Alan (c. 1878 – March 2, 1924) was an American sports writer and war journalist.

Life 
Father: Milton H. Sangree, Mother: Jane E. Hudson. Born around 1878, most likely in the area of Harrisburg or Steelton, Pennsylvania.

Attended Gettysburg College (class of 1892)
Member of the Sigma Chi Theta fraternity

On the staff of the New York Sun some time around 1896

With the New York World as a correspondent traveling to Africa reporting on the trouble between Great Britain and the South Africa Republic prior to the Boer war. He reported for Collier's during the Boer War as well as for Cosmopolitan

Started writing as one of the featured baseball writers for the New York Evening World on March 11, 1905

Married Kate Bradley (1888–1952) on November 4, 1905

On October 2, 1908 Allen Sangree was asked by William McMutrie Speer
(a member of the editorial staff of the New York World) via the city editor 

George Carteret, to locate some Panamanians who had recently came to town with a possible connection to William Nelson Cromwell and the Panama Canal. Allen was unable to locate them, reported back to the editorial staff with no story and the assignment was crossed off. However Allen's investigation did appear to have stirred up William Nelson Cromwell's PR staff who approached Caleb Van Hamm (the managing editor) and "demanded ... what the World meant by getting after his boss without giving him a look-in."

Died March 2, 1924, in Trenton, N.J., after having been hospitalized for a breakdown two years earlier.

Writings 
A turn of the century (1900s) writer.

Early references 
1892 he had a position with McClure's syndicate in New York and wrote for McClure's.

South Africa and the Boer War 
 Wrote a character sketch of Cecil Rhodes in the February 1900 issue of Ainslee's Magazine
 Was a New York journalist who was at one time stationed in Cape Town South Africa as the secretary of the U.S. consul-general.
 He covered the Boer War in South Africa traveled with General Christiaan De Wet

Sports writer 
 Wrote the often quoted piece

 Wrote the short story "The Jinx" in 1910, which was included later in his book The Jinx: Stories of the Diamond (1911) which is probably one of the earliest written references to the word jinx to mean someone being unlucky.
 A review of the book "The Jinx: Stories of the Diamond"

 Was a member of the Baseball Writers' Association of America in 1911 and 1914

Other Works 
Poet "Your Old Uncle Sam", which was put to the music of "The Old Grey Mare"

Bibliography

Short Stories 
 "A Break in Training", The Saturday Evening Post, February 18, 1911
 "The Naive Mr. Dasher-Story of a Baseball Jinx", The Saturday Evening Post, May 28, 1910
 "The Ringer", The Saturday Evening Post, May 6, 1911
 "In Dutch", The Saturday Evening Post June 17, 1911
 "The Indian Sign", The Saturday Evening Post, September 9, 1911
 "That Load of Hay", Top-Notch, September 20, 1914
 "A Time Exposure", The Popular Magazine, February 7, 1915
 "The Sacrifice Hit", The Popular Magazine, September 7, 1915
 "The Limited Male", The Popular Magazine, September 20, 1916
 "Nix on the Slaughter", "Ainslee's Magazine, October 1916

 Articles 
 "Americans in South Africa", Munsey's, March 1900
 "The Lonely Idol of the Fickle 'Fans'", The Saturday Evening Post, July 29, 1905
 "Why Nobody Loves the Umpire", The Saturday Evening Post, September 2, 1905

 Samuel Gompers and the labor movement 
There is a reference to Allen Sangree in the papers of Samuel Gompers where a friend, writes

There is a reference in the Congressional Record''

References 

American sportswriters
1870s births
1924 deaths